Union Valley is a ghost town in Lincoln County, Kansas, United States.

History
Union Valley was issued a post office in 1877. The post office was discontinued in 1888.

References

Former populated places in Lincoln County, Kansas
Former populated places in Kansas